In enzymology, a rubredoxin—NAD(P)+ reductase is an enzyme that catalyzes the chemical reaction

reduced rubredoxin + NAD(P)+  oxidized rubredoxin + NAD(P)H + H+

The 3 substrates of this enzyme are reduced rubredoxin, NAD+, and NADP+, whereas its 4 products are oxidized rubredoxin, NADH, NADPH, and H+.

This enzyme belongs to the family of oxidoreductases, specifically those acting on iron-sulfur proteins as donor with NAD+ or NADP+ as acceptor.  The systematic name of this enzyme class is rubredoxin:NAD(P)+ oxidoreductase. Other names in common use include rubredoxin-nicotinamide adenine dinucleotide (phosphate) reductase, rubredoxin-nicotinamide adenine, dinucleotide phosphate reductase, NAD(P)+-rubredoxin oxidoreductase, and NAD(P)H-rubredoxin oxidoreductase.  This enzyme participates in fatty acid metabolism.

References

External links 
 

EC 1.18.1
NADPH-dependent enzymes
NADH-dependent enzymes
Enzymes of unknown structure